Luis López (1 January 1924 – 7 July 2012) was a Chilean footballer. He played in three matches for the Chile national football team in 1949. He was also part of Chile's squad for the 1949 South American Championship.

References

External links
 

1924 births
2012 deaths
Chilean footballers
Chile international footballers
Place of birth missing
Association football forwards
Magallanes footballers